Joyce M.K. Murland (11 July 1937 – 19 January 2017) was a Canadian wheelchair athlete and Paralympics medalist. She competed in the 1972 and 1976 Summer Paralympics.

She was born in Edmonton and in her early 20s, she met her husband John and they moved to British Columbia. Joyce became involved with wheelchair sports and competed throughout the world.

References

1937 births
2017 deaths
Paralympic track and field athletes of Canada
Paralympic shooters of Canada
Paralympic silver medalists for Canada
Paralympic bronze medalists for Canada
Athletes (track and field) at the 1972 Summer Paralympics
Athletes (track and field) at the 1976 Summer Paralympics
Shooters at the 1976 Summer Paralympics
Medalists at the 1972 Summer Paralympics
Medalists at the 1976 Summer Paralympics
Paralympic medalists in athletics (track and field)
Paralympic medalists in shooting
Canadian female discus throwers
Canadian female javelin throwers
Canadian female shot putters
Canadian female sport shooters
Wheelchair discus throwers
Wheelchair javelin throwers
Wheelchair shot putters
Paralympic discus throwers
Paralympic javelin throwers
Paralympic shot putters
20th-century Canadian women